Arcadia, Washington is an unincorporated community in Mason County, Washington, which is located on southwest Puget Sound on a point of land which extends between Hammersley Inlet on the north and Totten Inlet on the south. It is situated between Olympia, Washington and Shelton, Washington.

History
Two steamboats are reported to have been built at Arcadia, the Arcadia (built 1889, 40 tons), and Biz (built 1881, 80 gross tons).

References

 Findlay, Jean Cammon, and Paterson, Robin, Mosquito Fleet of South Puget Sound, Arcadia Publishing (2008) .
 Newell, Gordon R., Ships of the Inland Sea -- The Story of the Puget Sound Steamboats, Binford & Mort (2d Ed. 1960)
 Wright, E.W., Lewis & Dryden's Marine history of the Pacific Northwest, Lewis & Dryden Printing Co., Portland, OR (1895)

Unincorporated communities in Mason County, Washington
Unincorporated communities in Washington (state)